The 2021 Omaha mayoral election was held in 2021. Incumbent Republican mayor Jean Stothert was re-elected to a third term in office. Stothert is the first person elected to a third consecutive term as mayor of Omaha in the modern era.

The position of mayor in Omaha is officially a non-partisan position. A blanket primary was held on April 6, 2021. The top two finishers in the primary moved on to the general election which was held on May 11, 2021.

Alongside the mayor, the Omaha City Council was up for re-election. It is also officially non-partisan. However, it remained controlled by a Democratic majority, as only district 7 has a general election between a Democrat and a Republican. Districts 1, 2, 3, 4 remained Democratic whereas districts 5 and 6 remained Republican. The incumbent Republican in district 7 was re-elected as well.

Primary election

Candidates

Declared
Mark Gudgel, high school English teacher (Party preference: Democratic)
Jasmine Harris, public health official (Party preference: Democratic)
RJ Neary, real estate broker (Party preference: Democratic)
Kimara Snipes, member of the Omaha school board (Party preference: Democratic)
Jean Stothert, incumbent mayor (Party preference: Republican)

Failed to qualify
Dawaune Hayes, founder and director of North Omaha Information Support Everyone (Party preference: Democratic) (endorsed Harris, then Neary)
Bill Queen, comedian

Declined
Jim Cavanaugh, Douglas County commissioner (Party preference: Democratic)

Debates

Endorsements

Results

General election

Candidates
Jean Stothert, incumbent mayor (Republican)
RJ Neary, real estate broker (Democratic)

Debate

Endorsements

Results

Results by city council district

References

External links
Official websites for mayoral candidates
 RJ Neary (D) for Mayor 
 Jean Stothert (R) for Mayor

Omaha
Mayoral elections in Omaha, Nebraska
2021 Nebraska elections